Gravity Falls: Legend of the Gnome Gemulets is a platform video game for the Nintendo 3DS, developed by Ubisoft Osaka and published by Ubisoft and produced by Disney Interactive Studios based on the animated Disney series Gravity Falls. The game utilizes the UbiArt Framework engine, and was released on October 20, 2015.

Gameplay
Gravity Falls: Legend of the Gnome Gemulets is a side-scrolling platform game. Players assume control of Dipper and Mabel, and they can freely switch between them at any moment during the game. The two characters have different abilities. Dipper can combat enemies with a close-ranged weapon called Gnome Battle Cuffs and look for clues using a flashlight, while Mabel can utilize a grappling hook to reach high grounds, and combat enemies with ranged attacks by her "Fleece of Bedazzlement-enhanced sweater sleeves". Players can purchase new items from vendors, and return to the regions they have previously explored, similar to a metroidvania. The game also includes humor based on its own cliché story utilized in videogames.

Development
Hirsch created the key art of the game. The game is an adaptation of the TV series instead of a tie-in. Therefore, the game features an original story. The game is powered by Ubisoft's in-house UbiArt Framework engine. Formally announced in July 2015, the game was released worldwide for the Nintendo 3DS on October 20 the same year.

Reception

Gravity Falls: Legend of the Gnome Gemulets had a negative reception. Nintendo Life gave the game an unfavorable review. Praise was given for the visuals and the character dialogue, but criticism was leveled at the game's short length and repetitive gameplay.

References

External links
 Official website

2015 video games
Gravity Falls
Nintendo 3DS games
Nintendo 3DS eShop games
Nintendo 3DS-only games
Ubisoft games
Video games developed in Japan
Disney video games
Video games based on television series
Video games set in Oregon
Works about vacationing